McCune is a surname. Notable people with the surname include:

 Adam McCune (novelist) (b. 1985), American novelist
 Alfred W. McCune (1849–1927), British-American railroad builder, mine owner, and Mormon
 Barron Patterson McCune (1915–2008), United States federal judge
 Bruce Pettit McCune (b. 1952), American lichenologist and botanist
 Debbie McCune Davis (b. 1951), American politician
 Earl McCune (1956–2020), American inventor, Silicon Valley entrepreneur, and electrical and telecommunications engineer
 Emma McCune (1964–1993), British foreign aid worker
 Elizabeth Ann Claridge McCune (1852–1924), Mormon missionary
 George M. McCune (1908–1948), co-developer of the McCune–Reischauer romanization system of the Korean language
 Grant McCune (1943–2010), American special effects designer
 Isaac McCune (1884–1959), Canadian politician
 Keith McCune (b. 1955), American author
 Lisa McCune (b. 1971), Australian actress
 Robert McCune (b. 1979), American football player
 Rolland D. McCune (b. 1934), American theologian
 Sara Miller McCune (b. 1941) is the co-founder and Chair of SAGE Publications
 Shannon Boyd-Bailey McCune (1913–1993), geographer and brother of George M. McCune
 Timothy S. McCune (b. 1963), Plainfield, NJ, President, Linear Integrated Systems
 William McCune (1953–2011), American computer scientist

See also
McCunn
MacEwen
McKeown

References